Johannes Grant or Johannis Grandi was a mercenary employed by the Byzantine Empire at the fall of Constantinople in 1453.
Contemporary Greek and Latin accounts referred to him as being German, although Runciman has suggested he may actually have been a Scot named John Grant. He appears to have been affiliated with the Genoese contingent of mercenaries at the siege, possibly part of the men commanded by Giovanni Giustiniani. His use of counter-mining tunnels prevented the Turks from weakening or invading Constantinople from under the walls.

Depictions in Fiction 

 Grant appears as a minor character in The Dark Angel by Mika Waltari
 John Le Grant, an Aberdonian based on the historical Johannes Grant, appears in The House of Niccolò by Dorothy Dunnett
 John Grant is the central character in the historical novel Porphyry and Ash
 John Grant is featured in the third episode of the historical docudrama series Rise of Empires: Ottoman; here he is depicted as Scottish.
 John Grant is the central character in the historical novel Master of Shadows by Neil Oliver

References 

Year of birth unknown
Year of death unknown
German military engineers
Scottish military engineers
15th-century Scottish people
15th-century German engineers
Fall of Constantinople
People of the Byzantine–Ottoman wars
Place of birth unknown